Aguanga (Luiseño: Awáanga, meaning "dog place") is a census-designated place located within the Inland Empire, Riverside County, California. Aguanga lies at an elevation of 1955 feet (596 m). As of the 2010 census, it had a population of 1,028.

History
The town gets its name from a former village of the Native village called awáanga, meaning 'dog place'.  The Butterfield Overland Mail established a station 1.7 miles to the west of the current Post Office in 1858. It was at first called Tejungo Station and was located 14 miles east of Temecula Station and 12 miles northwest of Oak Grove Stage Station. The wooden building was located in a grove of trees a few hundred feet from the stage road.  Soon, however, it became known as Aguanga Station after the name of the nearby Luiseño village. 

The November 7, 1861, report of Lieut. Col. Joseph R. West, mentioned the abandoned station location was then called Giftaler’s Ranch, after its German owner Joseph Giftaler, in a journal of his unit's march to Fort Yuma on the old Butterfield Overland Mail route. In a later Civil War itinerary of the route, it is referred to as the "Dutchman's". In 1863, Camp Giftaler Ranch was established at the ranch as a post along the march route of troops to Arizona Territory by the Union Army.

In 1864, Giftaler's Ranch was purchased by Jacob Bergman, also a German immigrant, stagecoach driver and Union Army veteran, who operated the Bergman Ranch there for many years until his death on September 13, 1894. After the Civil War, he ran Bergman's Stage Station there for the Banning and Tomlinson Stage lines for many years.  During the Julian Gold Rush, he ran the Guahonga post office there from July 27, 1870, to September 13, 1871. The post office for the area was then moved to Oak Grove until the Bergman post office was opened in 1894, but its name was changed to Aguanga in 1901.

Today the station site is on the Twin Creek Stage Stop Ranch, on Allmouth Road, found just east of the Stagecoach Inn at 43851 Highway 79. The ruins of the old wooden station building and ranch house is located among a grove of trees, at the foot of the west end of the hill at the bottom of the meadow, along the right fork of Allmouth Road. The small, fenced-in Bergman Family Cemetery and the Jacob Bergman Marker are found on Caprice Road, 200 feet from the highway, just across the highway from the entrance to the ranch and a short distance to the east.

2020 shooting
On September 7, 2020, deputies with the Riverside County Sheriff's Department responded to reports of an assault with a deadly weapon at a residence along Route 371. Upon responding, they found a woman suffering gunshot wounds, who eventually died from her injuries after being rushed to a hospital. The deputies then discovered six additional victims inside the home, all of whom were dead from gunshots. Authorities announced the shooting was an isolated incident but no suspects were in custody and remain at large. The residence where the shooting occurred was reportedly being used to grow illegal marijuana. As of October 28, authorities have not found a motive or any viable suspects. The shooting is the deadliest in Riverside County's history.

Geography
According to the United States Census Bureau, the CDP covers an area of 13.6 square miles (35.2 km), all of it land.

The community of Aguanga lies near the intersection of State Route 79 (SR 79) and State Route 371 (Cahuilla Road), along the historic Butterfield Overland Mail stage route. The town is also home to Cottonwood Elementary School (K–8) operated by the Hemet Valley Unified School District.

This area is in a canyon beside Temecula Creek near Pechanga tribal lands and the San Diego County line. It is within area code 951 and shares its ZIP Code, 92536, with the San Diego County community of Holcomb Village.

Climate
According to the Köppen climate classification system, Aguanga has a hot-summer Mediterranean climate, abbreviated "Csa" on climate maps.

Demographics

The 2010 United States Census reported that Aguanga had a population of 1,128. The racial makeup of Aguanga was 929 (82.4%) White (69.2% Non-Hispanic White), 11 (1.0%) African American, 20 (1.8%) Native American, 24 (2.1%) Asian, 0 (0.0%) Pacific Islander, 109 (9.7%) from other races, and 35 (3.1%) from two or more races. Hispanic or Latino of any race were 274 persons (24.3%).

The Census reported that 1,128 people (100% of the population) lived in households, 0 (0%) lived in non-institutionalized group quarters, and 0 (0%) were institutionalized.

There were 470 households, out of which 81 (17.2%) had children under the age of 18 living in them, 279 (59.4%) were opposite-sex married couples living together, 33 (7.0%) had a female householder with no husband present, 22 (4.7%) had a male householder with no wife present.  There were 36 (7.7%) unmarried opposite-sex partnerships, and 1 (0.2%) same-sex married couples or partnerships. 107 households (22.8%) were made up of individuals, and 65 (13.8%) had someone living alone who was 65 years of age or older. The average household size was 2.40.  There were 334 families (71.1% of all households); the average family size was 2.77.

The population was spread out, with 173 people (15.3%) under the age of 18, 89 people (7.9%) aged 18 to 24, 161 people (14.3%) aged 25 to 44, 365 people (32.4%) aged 45 to 64, and 340 people (30.1%) who were 65 years of age or older.  The median age was 53.4 years. For every 100 females, there were 102.5 males.  For every 100 females age 18 and over, there were 104.5 males.

The homeowner vacancy rate was 1.3%; the rental vacancy rate was 8.2%.  881 people (78.1% of the population) lived in owner-occupied housing units and 247 people (21.9%) lived in rental housing units.

According to the 2010 United States Census, Aguanga had a median household income of $49,618, with 8.5% of the population living below the federal poverty line.

References

External links
 Aguanga Website and Forums about Aguanga
 ||||&item=1&index=6&nav=next Buildings of the Jake Bergman Ranch, Geddes, L. J. [Copy Print]; Unidentified Photographer.  Copy of a 19th-century photograph of buildings at the Jake Bergman Ranch in Aguanga, California, early to mid-1900s. Caption: JAKE BERGMAN RANCH, AGUANGA, CENTER BUILDING IS OLD BUTTERFIELD STAGE STATION TAKEN FROM OLD PRINT.  Courtesy of Southwest Museum of the American Indian Collection from ehumanitydev.pti.indiana.edu accessed June 5, 2013.

Census-designated places in Riverside County, California
Butterfield Overland Mail in California
Census-designated places in California